Sree Kunninmathilakam Mahadeva Temple is situated at Cheruthazham in Kannur, Kerala. The old name of this temple is Sree Kunninmathilakam Shiva Temple. Shiva of this temple is known as 'Sree Kunninmathilakathappan'. Sree Kunninmathilakathappan is worshipped as Lord Dakshinamoorthy in the morning, Lord Kirathamoorthy at noon, and Lord Umamaheshwara in the evening by devotees.

Another famous temple, Sree Raghavapuram Temple (Hanumarambalam), is also at Cheruthazham.

The nearest railway station to the temple is Payangadi.

Website of Cheruthazham Sree Kunninmathilakam Mahadeva Temple, http://kunninmathilakam.com

History 
In Treta Yuga, Lord Anjaneya, the devoted and trustworthy envoy of Lord Sree Rama, was entrusted to install the deity of Lord Mahadeva in Rameswaram by Lord Sree Rama. On his way, he installed one part of the deity of Lord Mahadeva in this sacred land; thereby, he reached late at Rameswaram. Due to Lord Anjaneya's belated arrival, Lord Sree Rama installed Lord Mahadeva's deity made in clay and imparted the remaining life force to the clay deity situating in Dhanushkodi.

Because of the immense blessing power and the importance of this land, Gods and Saints worshiped the deity of Lord Mahadeva in this place. In Kali Yuga, about six of the Brahmin families constructed the main Sanctum, Sanctorum of Lord Mahadeva, in this place and worshiped the deity in three different forms—Lord Dakshina Murthi in the morning, Lord Kiratha Murthi at noon and Lord Uma Maheswar in the evening. Lately, because of the negligence of fostering and foreign invasion, many parts of the temple had been destroyed. During the 1980s, the families of the temple trustees and local devotees started the renovation work of this temple.

An astrological thought was conducted in the temple from 7 March to 13 March 2011, and many remedial works had been revealed to conducted. Thereafter, a well structured committee has been formed and started the efforts to retain the ancient grace of the temple. The renovation of the main Sanctum Sanctorum, the Namaskara Mandapam, the four-sided building around the Sanctum Sanctorum (nalambalam), the temple for Lord Vigneshar, the temple for Lord Subrahmanya, and the Saraswathi Mandapa are some of the most important works to be completed.

Offerings 
Vazhipadu:
Nithya Pooja
Niramala
Vilakkum Mala
Koovala Mala
Neyvilakku
Pinvilakku
Ennavilakku
Swayamvara Pushpanjali
Sivasahasranama Pushplanjali
Mruthyunjaya Pushpanjali
Pushapanjali
Neyyamruth
Chandrakkala Oppikkal
Thrimadhuram 
Malar Nivedyam
Ganapathi Homam
Mruthyunjaya Homam
Karuka Homam
Thilahomam
Rundrabhishekam
Jaladhara
Sanghabhishekam
Vahana Pooja
Payasam
Vella Nivedyam
Ilaneer Abhishekam
Palabhishekam
Enna Abhishekam

Renovation 
Kshethra Punarudharanam:

To retain the ancient grace of the temple we formed a structured committee and initiated the renovation of the temple. The renovation of the main Sanctum Sanctorum, Namaskara Mandapam, four-sided building around the Sanctum Sanctorum (nalambalam), temple for Lord Vigneshar, temple for Lord Subrahmanya, Saraswathi Mandapa are some of the most important works to be completed without delay.

References 

 https://web.archive.org/web/20141129040959/http://www.kunninmathilakam.com/
 Places of worship in Kannur district#Cheruthazham Sree Raghavapuram Temple (Hanumarambalam)
 Kovval
 http://www.shaivam.org/siddhanta/spke-kannur-temples.htm

Hindu temples in Kannur district
Shiva temples in Kerala